Flying Whales is a French aeronautic start-up. It develops an environmentally-friendly airship, the LCA60T, designed to transport heavy loads, such as wood logs or specific gear like wind-turbine blades, without structure supports.

History 
Founded in 2012 by Sébastien Bougon, this project was initially dedicated to wood exploitation in partnership with the French organization in charge of public forest management, the Office National des Forêts (ONF).

A first prototype is expected in 2023, while a market launch of the first models is planned for 2025.

Equity 
The company receives financial support from several institutional players including, the French government with 29.5 million euros, the Canadian province of Quebec via Investment Quebec for 30 million dollars, and the Aviation Industry Corporation of China (AVIC) which sells its own corporate equity (24.9%) to the others French shareholders of Flying Whales and the French banking group Oddo BHF in September 2021.

In July 2022, the company announced that it had raised 122 million euros to finalize the development of the LCA60T. Investors in this round include the Government of France via the French public investment bank Bpifrance, as part of the France 2030 program designed to revive the French industrial sector.The others investors are the Principality of Monaco with the Société Nationale de Financement, as well as Air Liquide's ALIAD venture capital fund, the Groupe ADP and Société Générale Assurances.

The LCA60T 
Conceived as a means of transport to open up certain regions inaccessible by road, the LCA60T could be sized as the largest aircraft in activity, with 200 meters long and 50 meters high, according to its CEO Sébastien Bougon.

References 

Aircraft manufacturers of France
Airships of France
French companies established in 2012
Suresnes